Sustainable House Day is a national event held annually across Australia, where households open their doors to the public to give interested people the chance to learn about the benefits of energy efficiency, renewable energy and sustainable design and how to apply it in their own homes. Participants have the opportunity to speak with sustainable home owners, architects, builders, designers and energy auditors to learn about sustainable living.

The event began in 1994 as Solar House Day, and several organisations have run it over the years. Not-for-profit organisation Renew, publisher of Renew and Sanctuary magazines, has run the event since 2017.

The 2020 date is September 20.

References

External links 
Sustainable House Day (official site)

Environmental awareness days
Annual events in Australia
September observances
Housing in Australia